William Thompson Nuckolls (February 23, 1801 – September 27, 1855) was a U.S. Representative from South Carolina.

Born near Hancockville, Union (now Cherokee) County, South Carolina, Nuckolls graduated from South Carolina College (now the University of South Carolina) at Columbia in 1820.
He studied law.
He was admitted to the bar in 1823 and commenced practice in Spartanburg, South Carolina.

Nuckolls was elected as a Jacksonian to the Twentieth, Twenty-first, and Twenty-second Congresses (March 4, 1827 – March 3, 1833).
He died on his plantation near Hancockville, South Carolina, on September 27, 1855.
He was interred in Whig Hill Cemetery.

Sources

1801 births
1855 deaths
University of South Carolina alumni
Jacksonian members of the United States House of Representatives from South Carolina
19th-century American politicians